The 2022 Copa Uruguay (officially known as Copa AUF Uruguay 2022), was the first edition of the Copa Uruguay, the country's national football cup tournament. The tournament began on 22 June and ended on 13 November, and had 76 teams participating.

Defensor Sporting were the first winners of the competition, defeating La Luz in the final match 1–0.

Format
The competition was divided into two stages: a preliminary stage and the national stage. In the preliminary stage, teams from the amateur lower leagues competed for 20 berths to the national stage. In the first phase of the national stage, 28 teams from the Primera División Amateur and Segunda División entered the competition, for a total of 48 teams which are divided into 24 ties, with the winners qualifying for the second round. The 24 second round winners advanced to play against each other to define 12 winners into the third phase.

32 teams played in the third phase: 12 winners from the previous phase, 16 professional teams from the Primera División, the best relegated team of Primera División the previous season (Progreso), the defending champion of the Primera División Amateur (Miramar Misiones) and the defending champion and runner-up of the Copa Nacional de Clubes (Central and Juventud (Colonia)). From this point onwards, the winners played against each other in single-legged knockout phases except for the semi-finals, which were played over two legs, whilst the Final was played in a single match.

The winner of the competition was also awarded a US$ 100,000 prize.

Qualified teams
The following teams qualified for the competition. Villa Teresa declined to participate.

Draw 
The draw of the competition was held on 14 June 2022, at the Centro Cultural Teatro Español in Durazno. The draw was divided into two stages: in the first one the ties for the preliminary and first stages were drawn, dividing the entering teams into four zones according to geographical criteria: Norte, Sur/Metropolitana, Este, and Centro/Litoral, while in the second stage the ties for the third stage were drawn, involving the 20 Primera División, Segunda División, and OFI Serie A entrants.

Preliminary stage

Zona Norte

Zona Sur/Metropolitana

Zona Este

Zona Centro/Litoral

First stage

Zona Norte

Zona Sur/Metropolitana

Zona Este

Zona Centro/Litoral

Second stage

Zona Norte

Zona Sur/Metropolitana

Zona Este

Zona Centro/Litoral

Third stage

Bracket

Round of 16

Quarter-finals

Semi-finals

|}

First leg

Second leg

Final

Top scorers

Source: AUF

See also 
 2022 Uruguayan Primera División season
 2022 Uruguayan Segunda División season

References 

Uruguay

Copa Uruguay